CATCO may refer to:
 Contemporary American Theatre Company, a regional professional theatre company in Columbus, Ohio, United States
 Calgary Alternative Transportation Co-operative, see List of cooperatives
 Crowley All Terrain Corp, a division of Crowley Maritime